Eulamprotes plumbella is a moth of the family Gelechiidae. It has a local distribution in central and northern Europe.

The wingspan is 10–11 mm. Adults are on wing from June to July.

References

Moths described in 1870
Eulamprotes
Moths of Europe